20th Century Home Entertainment (previously known as 20th Century Fox Home Entertainment) is a home video brand label of Walt Disney Studios Home Entertainment that distributes films produced by 20th Century Studios, Searchlight Pictures, and 20th Century Animation, and television series by 20th Television, Searchlight Television, 20th Television Animation, and FX Productions in home entertainment formats.

Established in 1982, it served as its own distinct home video distribution arm of Fox Entertainment Group. On March 20, 2019, The Walt Disney Company acquired 21st Century Fox, and as a result, 20th Century Home Entertainment's operations were folded into Disney's own home entertainment division. It now operates as a brand label of Walt Disney Studios Home Entertainment and also releases titles from other third-party studios it has prior distribution deals with.

History

20th Century-Fox Video

In March 1979, 20th Century-Fox acquired Magnetic Video Corporation, a small independent home video distributor founded by Andre Blay and Leon Nicholson that was based in Farmington Hills, Michigan, after a previous relationship with the company. In 1982, Fox renamed Magnetic Video Corporation to 20th Century-Fox Video and continued to be headquartered in Farmington Hills, Michigan. However, Blay was forced out at the time, with Telecommunications division president and CEO Steve Roberts taking charge of TCF Video.

During this time, 20th Century-Fox Video released a few titles for rental only, including Dr. No, A Fistful of Dollars, Rocky, Taps, For Your Eyes Only, Omen III: The Final Conflict, Chu Chu and the Philly Flash, La Cage aux Folles II, and Star Wars. While sale tapes were in big boxes that were later used by CBS/Fox in its early years (dubbed "Fox Boxes" by VHS collectors), Video Rental Library tapes were packaged in black clamshell cases. Similar approaches were taken by other companies; however, none lasted long.

CBS/Fox Video

In June 1982, 20th Century Fox entered into a joint venture with CBS to form CBS/Fox Video; Roberts remained head of the joint-venture, but was replaced as president in January 1983 by a former Columbia Pictures executive, Larry Hilford. Hilford had been a verbal critic of the video rental business, but with the situation out of their control, he attempted to make the situation work for them. CBS/Fox and other home video units increased prices of the cassettes by around 67% to maximize income. They also moved to encourage customer purchasing instead of renting. As a part of that, CBS/Fox looked to existing retail chains for direct sales. Toys R Us and Child World signed the first direct deals in July 1985 with CBS/Fox. Walt Disney Home Video soon followed with a direct deal with Toys R Us.

During this period, two sub-labels of the company were created. The first was Key Video, launched in April 1984, structured as a separate company but utilizing the CBS/Fox sales and marketing arms; Key's remit was to exploit catalog titles (from both CBS and Fox as well as other companies whose catalogs CBS/Fox had access to at the time, including Lorimar, ITC and United Artists) targeted towards collectors and longer shelf life than other titles (later expanded to include acquired titles and non-theatrical programming from outside CBS/Fox, primarily B-movies). Key's offerings were often, though not always, priced for sale at cheaper rates than mainstream CBS/Fox titles. The other was Playhouse Video, launched in February 1985 (replacing the short-lived CBS/Fox Children's Video label) and run in a similar fashion to Key Video, with am emphasis on children's and family titles, including those of The Muppets and content from CBS (including the Dr. Seuss specials owned by the network and Peanuts movies and specials). Both of these labels were rendered inactive by 1991; under Fox, the Key Video name (later renamed to Key DVD) made a brief comeback in the 2000s.

In March 1991, a reorganization of the company was made, which would give Fox greater control of the joint venture. All of CBS/Fox's distribution functions were transferred to the newly formed FoxVideo, which would also take over exclusive distribution of all 20th Century Fox products. CBS began releasing their products under the "CBS Video" name (which had been sparingly used since the 1970s), with CBS/Fox handling marketing and Fox Video handling distribution. CBS/Fox would retain the license to non-theatrical products from third parties, including those from BBC Video and the NBA.

Fox Video was run by president Bob DeLellis, a 1984 hire at CBS/Fox who had risen to group vice president and president by 1991. With expected repeat viewing, FoxVideo dropped prices on family films starting in June 1991 with Home Alone at a suggested list price of $24.98, to encourage purchasing over rental.

Bill Mechanic's arrival in 1993 from Walt Disney Home Video, as the new head of Fox Filmed Entertainment, saw new plans to move Fox forward, including Fox Video. However, DeLellis was initially left alone, as Mechanic was occupied setting up multiple creative divisions within Fox. Mechanic had been the one to install the "Vault" moratorium strategy at Disney. Mrs. Doubtfire was released soon after Mechanic's arrival with a sell through price, and surpassed sale projections at 10 million tapes.

Twentieth Century Fox Home Entertainment 

 

The company was renamed Twentieth Century Fox Home Entertainment on March 16, 1995, after Fox Entertainment Group acquired CBS's interest in CBS/Fox. The reorganization also created additional distribution operations (Fox Kids Video, CBS Video, and CBS/Fox Video) and two new media units, Fox Interactive and Magnet Interactive Studios. Total revenue for the expanded business unit would have been over $800 million, with FoxVideo providing the bulk at $650 million. Mechanic kept DeLellis as president of the expanded unit's North American operation, with Jeff Yap as international president. By May 1995, Fox had Magnet under a worldwide label deal for 10 to 12 titles through 1996. TCFHE would also be responsible for DVD when they hit the market. Mechanic had Fox Home Entertainment institute the moratorium strategy with the August 1995 release of the three original Star Wars movies giving them a sales window before going off the market forever; four months for New Hope, and until the fall of 1997 for The Empire Strikes Back and Return of the Jedi. Sales topped 30 million copies over expectations. The company's 1996 release of Independence Day sold 18 million units, making it the industry's bestselling live-action home video release. In 1996, Saban Entertainment, who had left WarnerVision Entertainment, signed a deal with the company for distribution.

With the May 1997 departure of DeLellis, a quick rotation of presidents lead Fox Home Entertainment: Yapp for four months before he left to lead Hollywood Video, then an interim president—Pat Wyatt, head of Twentieth Century Fox Licensing & Merchandising, who assumed the post in September 1997. With DVD being a Warner Home Video property, the company did not initially issue DVDs; instead, Fox advocated for digital VHS tapes (which eventually emerged as the obscure D-Theater), then the disposable DIVX. DIVX was a DVD variant that had limited viewing time, launched by the Circuit City consumer electronics chain in June 1998. With DVD's low cost at $20 and DIVX at $4.50, and the desirability for consumers to own DVDs, the DVD format won quickly out over DIVX. News Corp. chief Rupert Murdoch wanted a deal with Time Warner Cable, as to secure a lower channel position for the then-new Fox Family Channel, so Mechanic adopted the DVD format to smooth the deal.

By 1998, Wyatt became permanent president of Twentieth Century Fox Home Entertainment. Wyatt then became head of Fox Consumer Products, which put together the video and licensing unit. Wyatt had to drop the licensing half eventually, as the home video unit boomed. DVD sales were so strong during this period that they factored into green-lighting theatrical films. Wyatt reorganized Fox Home Entertainment, and forged a partnership with replicator Cinram. Being ahead of the other studios, TCFHE began picking up additional outside labels as distribution clients, with their fees covering the company's overhead. Fox Home Entertainment won multiple Vendor of the Year awards. Wyatt's system was a great edge for years. The TV-on-DVD business was initiated by Wyatt through the release of whole seasons of The X-Files, The Simpsons and 24, which started the binge-watching concept. However, the videocassette rental business was declining such that video rental chains signed revenue-sharing deals with the studios, so additional copies of hits could be brought in for a lower price, and share sales for more customer satisfaction.

Mechanic left Fox in June 2000, while Wyatt resigned in December 2002. Jim Gianopulos replaced Mechanic, while executive vice president of domestic marketing and sales, Mike Dunn, took over from Wyatt. Wyatt left to start a direct-to-video film production and financing company for Japanese-style animated programming.

In 2004, 20th Century Fox passed on theatrical distribution, but picked up domestic home video rights to The Passion of the Christ. Passion sold 15 million DVDs. TCFHE continued obtaining additional Christian films' domestic home video rights for movies like Mother Teresa and the Beyond the Gates of Splendor documentary. After a 2005 test with a Fox Faith website, in 2006, 20th Century Fox Home Entertainment launched its own film production banner for religious films using the same name.

Effective October 1, 2005, 20th Century Fox Scandinavia was split into two, 20th Century Fox Theatrical Sweden and 20th Century Fox Home Entertainment Scandinavia. For the Home Entertainment Scandinavia division, Peter Paumgardhen was appointed managing director and would report to senior vice president of 20th Century Fox Home Entertainment Europe Gary Ferguson.

By 2005, DVD was on the decline and the rise of HDTVs required a new, high-resolution format; Fox and half the studios backed Blu-ray, while the other half backed HD DVD, and some planned to issue releases in both formats. In late 2006, the company began releasing its titles on Blu-ray. Blu-ray won the format war in 2008, but with streaming services picking up in popularity and the Great Recession, the expected rebound in disc sales never happened. In 2006, animation studio DIC Entertainment struck a deal with the studio to release DiC content on DVD.

With Metro-Goldwyn-Mayer moving its home video distribution to TCFHE in 2006, by this time the company had moved into second place behind Warner Bros. and ahead of Walt Disney, and had its best year yet. In October, Fox Home Entertainment issued the first to include a digital copy along on a disc with the special-edition DVD of Live Free or Die Hard. The 2010 Blu-ray release of Avatar was the year's top-selling title and the top Blu-ray Disc seller, with 5 million units sold. In 2011, Fox released on Blu-ray Disc the full Star Wars double trilogy on 9 discs, a premium set selling 1 million units its first week in stores, generating $84 million in gross sales.

In response to Warner Bros., Sony and MGM issuing manufactured-on-demand lines of no-frills DVD-R editions of older films in May 2012, TCFHE began its Cinema Archives series. By November 2012, the archive series had released 100 movies. Fox Home Entertainment also started the early window policy, where the digital version is released through digital retailers two or three weeks before the discs, and was launched with Prometheus in September 2012. This also started Fox's Digital HD program where customers could download or stream 600 Fox films on connected devices at less than $15/film through multiple major platforms. However, Digital HD was soon dropped as 4K, or Ultra HD, was introduced in 2012. In 2014, a high-tech think tank, Fox Innovation Lab, was formed under 20th Century Fox Home Entertainment.

In September 2015, the first Ultra HD Blu-ray player was introduced, leading TCFHE to have future movies released the same day in Ultra HD Blu-ray as regular Blu-ray and DVD. The first Ultra HD Blu-ray films were released in March 2016, with Fox being one of four studios involved; Fox had had the most titles with 10.

Dunn added another title in December 2016: president of product strategy and consumer business development. Dunn turned over TCFHE in March 2017 to Keith Feldman taking over his older title, president of worldwide home entertainment. Feldman was previously president of worldwide home entertainment distribution, and, before that, president of international.

20th Century Home Entertainment (Disney acquisition)
In December 2017, the acquisition of 21st Century Fox by The Walt Disney Company was proposed. After approval was given, Disney acquired most of 21st Century Fox's entertainment assets on March 20, 2019, including Twentieth Century Fox Home Entertainment.

On January 17, 2020, Disney retired the "Fox" name from several of the acquired 21st Century Fox assets (to avoid confusion with Fox Corporation), including the renaming of Twentieth Century Fox Home Entertainment as 20th Century Home Entertainment. Disney also folded 20th Century Home Entertainment into their existing Walt Disney Studios Home Entertainment division to be used solely as a brand label to distribute films and television series by 20th Century Studios, Searchlight Pictures, 20th Television, 20th Century Animation, Searchlight Television, 20th Television Animation, and FX Productions. Additionally, the 20th Century Studios logo now serves as the all-encompassing logo for 20th Century Home Entertainment.

Catalog library
20th Century Home Entertainment is used as the home video label for products released under the 20th Century Studios, Searchlight Pictures, 20th Century Animation, 20th Television, 20th Television Animation, FX Productions, and Touchstone Television, banners, alongside other owned material. 20th's best selling DVD titles are the various season box sets of The Simpsons.

Distribution agreements

Annapurna Pictures 
20th Century Home Entertainment distributes films for Annapurna Pictures, as part of a distribution pact which began in July 2017.

Pathé
Since July 1993, Fox's Home video operations in France have operated as a joint-venture. Originally, the joint-venture was between Fox, Pathé and Le Studio Canal+, titled PFC Video (Pathé Fox Canal). In January 2001, StudioCanal exited the venture to start distributing releases through then-sister company Universal Pictures Home Video (later switching to self-distributing their releases), and EuropaCorp joined the joint-venture, which was renamed to Fox Pathé Europa. The fate of the venture is currently unknown after the purchase of Fox from Disney, as Pathé currently self-distribute their home video releases.

Since 1996, Fox has also been the home video and digital distributor of Pathé's movies in the United Kingdom as well, after the latter acquired Guild Home Video that year. Fox released Guild products from then on, and also operated a rental joint-venture called Fox Guild Home Entertainment, which was later renamed to Fox Pathé Home Entertainment. This physical and digital agreement later briefly carried over to Walt Disney Studios Home Entertainment before expiring on June 30, 2021, after Pathé signed a new partnership deal with Warner Bros. Entertainment UK.

Paramount Global
In 2013, 20th Century Fox Home Entertainment partnered with Paramount to form Fox-Paramount Home Entertainment in Nordic territories. In 2020, the company was shut down.

Metro-Goldwyn-Mayer
In 1999, after ending their worldwide deal with Warner Home Video, MGM sold their international home video rights to Fox, allowing the company to release MGM films outside of North America.

In May 2003, MGM reinstated full distribution rights to their products in regions like Australia, France, Germany and the United Kingdom, although Fox would continue to distribute for MGM in a majority of developing regions.

In 2006, MGM signed a worldwide distribution deal with Fox, reinstating the rights internationally. TCFHE and MGM renewed their home video distribution deal in 2011 and June 2016, and it expired on June 30, 2020, with Warner Bros. Home Entertainment taking over afterwards. As of 2021, Studio Distribution Services, LLC., a joint venture between Warner Bros. Home Entertainment and Universal Pictures Home Entertainment, distributes in North America, with releases alternating between the two companies.

Entertainment One
After a prior home entertainment distribution arrangement for Australia and Spain, in February 2016, Entertainment One (eOne) and 20th Century Fox Home Entertainment signed a new multi-territory distribution agreement. The agreement called for a distribution joint venture in Canada. In the UK, Ireland, the Netherlands, Belgium, Luxembourg, Spain and Australia, Fox would manage eOne's existing home video distribution.

In March 2019, after the purchase of Fox by Disney, Entertainment One ended their deal with Fox and signed a multinational distribution deal with Universal Pictures Home Entertainment shortly after.

Other US deals
In the United States, the company also distributed products from Relativity Media, EuropaCorp U.S.A., Annapurna Pictures and Yari Film Group.

They also once served as the U.S. distributor for television and/or film products released by BBC Video until those North American distribution rights expired in 2000 and were transferred to Warner Home Video; since 2017, the BBC currently self-distribute their DVDs in the country.

They served as distributor of Saban Entertainment's titles from its 1996 acquisition by Fox to the 2002 sale of the studio to Disney.

In 2006, after closing their self-distribution unit, HIT Entertainment signed a home video deal with Fox. In 2008, HIT moved domestic distribution to Lionsgate Home Entertainment.

In 2006, with the successful sales of DIC Entertainment's Strawberry Shortcake series in the US, Fox signed a home video deal with American Greetings in 2007, which also included the Care Bears and Sushi Pack franchises. In 2009, AG moved distribution to Lionsgate Home Entertainment with the exception of Strawberry Shortcake, which remained under Fox.

From 2006 until 2009, the company also had a distribution deal with DIC Entertainment for the Care Bears, Madeline, Inspector Gadget and Dennis the Menace shows.

In 2008, WWE Studios inked a deal with 20th Century Fox, allowing it to distribute one theatrical title and four direct-to-video titles annually.

References

External links
 

Home video companies of the United States
Home video distributors
Walt Disney Studios (division)
Entertainment companies based in California
Companies based in Los Angeles
Entertainment companies established in 1982
1982 establishments in California
Home Entertainment
Century City, Los Angeles
The Walt Disney Company subsidiaries
Former News Corporation subsidiaries